The SNCASE SE.3120 Alouette ("Lark") was a utility helicopter developed in France in the early 1950s but which did not enter production. Designed in parallel with the SE.3110, the Alouette shared that machine's dynamic components, with the exception of the SE.3110's unusual twin tail rotor, which was replaced by a single rotor, and the addition of a three-bladed gyroscopic stabiliser under the main rotor (similar to the stabiliser bar used by Bell helicopters. The Alouette featured an open-framework fuselage behind a cockpit that was enclosed by a bubble canopy. Skid undercarriage and tricycle gear were both tested.

The first flight took place on 31 July 1951 at Buc, Yvelines with test pilot Henri Stakenburg at the controls. On 2 July 1953, Jean Boulet flew one of the two prototype Alouettes to a world closed-circuit distance record for a helicopter in this class, covering  in 13 hours and 56 minutes. Despite this impressive performance, the Alouette proved to be difficult to maintain, with its obsolete Salmson engine not being powerful enough, and with work on the turbine-powered Alouette II (an unrelated design) already underway, development of the Alouette was soon abandoned.

Specifications

References

External links
 Eurocopter website
 aviafrance.com

1950s French civil utility aircraft
1950s French helicopters
Aircraft first flown in 1951
Alouette
Single-engined piston helicopters